Cervulus is the diminutive of cervus, the Latin name for "deer, stag". It may refer to:
a historical name of the zoological genus Muntjac
Cervula, a Roman-era pagan festival on New Year's Eve